Glossostemon is a genus of perennial herb in the family Malvaceae native to Iraq, Iran and the Arabian Peninsula. It has lobed, serrated leaves and numerous flowers. The flower petals are flat with longitudinal ribs on the upper surface.

Species include:

 Glossostemon bruguieri (Synonym: Dombeya arabica Baker)

References

Byttnerioideae
Monotypic Malvales genera
Malvaceae genera